James Zar (1941 – 10 December 2015), also known as The Still Life Magician, was an American artist notable for his oil-based, fantasy art. Although his works vary, his primary subject matter was still life. He was the stepfather of painter and digital animator Chet Zar.

Born in San Pedro, California, Zar originally studied as an actor. His friend and mentor, Keith Finch, inspired Zar to pursue fine art.

References

External links
James Zar Homepage
James Zar - Surreal Art Collective

1941 births
2015 deaths
Artists from Los Angeles